601 may refer to:

 601 AD, (The year)
 CCIR 601, Interlaced Analog to Digital Video encoding standard (AKA: ITU-R BT.601 )
 PowerPC 601, a microprocessor shipped by the AIM alliance in 1993